Git! is a 1965 American drama film directed by Ellis Kadison and written by Homer McCoy. The film stars Jack Chaplain, Heather North, Leslie Bradley, Richard Webb, Hanna Landy and Emory Parnell. The film was released in October 1965, by Embassy Pictures.

Plot

Deke, a 17 year-old itinerant orphan from a boy's home, is arrested by the authorities after he stops Art Finney, a trainer for a wealthy California dog breeder, Andrew Garrett, from shooting "Rock", a renegade English setter and alleged animal killer. Garrett has Deke remanded to his custody and gives him a job assisting an uncooperative Finney and also working with Rock, whom Deke asserts can become a fine hunting dog. Finney and Garrett don't agree, but gradually come round to accept his belief in Rock.

Cast     
Jack Chaplain as Deke
Heather North as Elaine
Leslie Bradley as Finney
Richard Webb as Andrew Garrett
Hanna Landy as Mrs. Finney
Emory Parnell as T.C. Knox
Joseph Hamilton as Jed
Richard Valentine as District Attorney
Jeff Burton as Police Sergeant
Sherry Moreland as Dr. Allan
Shug Fisher as Sam Lewis

References

External links
 

1965 films
American drama films
1965 drama films
Embassy Pictures films
1960s English-language films
1960s American films